Ricardo Salas is a Panamanian weightlifter. He competed in the men's light heavyweight event at the 1984 Summer Olympics.

References

Year of birth missing (living people)
Living people
Panamanian male weightlifters
Olympic weightlifters of Panama
Weightlifters at the 1984 Summer Olympics
Central American and Caribbean Games medalists in weightlifting
Place of birth missing (living people)
20th-century Panamanian people
21st-century Panamanian people